The  ("Laval University Sports and Physical Education Complex"), usually called PEPS for short, is a sports complex located in Quebec City, Quebec, on the Université Laval campus. PEPS opened in 1970 and includes an outdoor stadium, an indoor stadium, two indoor swimming pools (aquatic centre), basketball and tennis courts, a fitness centre, and two hockey arenas.

For the 1976 Summer Olympics, it hosted four women's and seven men's team handball competitions.

The main arena seats 2,000 and was home to the reborn Quebec Remparts of the Quebec Major Junior Hockey League from 1997 to 1999 when they moved back to their traditional home at the Colisée Pepsi.

From 2004 to 2018, PEPS was home to the WTA Tour Coupe Banque Nationale.  From 2009 to 2012, it was home to the Quebec Kebs basketball franchise in the National Basketball League of Canada.

A major expansion from 2010 to 2012 added an indoor Olympic size swimming pool, a 3,000-seat gymnasium, a covered soccer stadium, and other facilities. Upgrades were also made to the outdoor stadium.

PEPS Stadium (Telus Stadium)

It is officially a 12,817-seat Canadian football and soccer stadium. It was built in 1994. Approximately 2,000 seats were added to the stadium in preparation for the two events, which were the 45th and 46th Vanier Cup games, bringing seated capacity up to 12,257 from the previous 10,200.

In June 2003, a Canadian Football League exhibition game between the Montreal Alouettes and the Ottawa Renegades was held at PEPS. In December 2008, Canadian Interuniversity Sport awarded the 2009 and 2010 Vanier Cup to Quebec City. The 2009 title game was sold out, with 18,628 fans in the stands including standing room. Attendance at the 2010 Vanier Cup was over 16,000. Subsequent championship games were awarded to Laval in 2013, 2015, 2018, and 2019.

On October 20, 2019, a record 19,381 fans attended the Rouge et Or game against the Montreal Carabins as the program celebrated their 25th anniversary.

Vanier Cup games

Professional Canadian football

References

External links
Profile at ULaval's website
Official Website

Indoor ice hockey venues in Quebec
Venues of the 1976 Summer Olympics
Olympic handball venues
Quebec Major Junior Hockey League arenas
Université Laval
Canadian football venues in Quebec
Sports venues in Quebec City
Basketball venues in Quebec
Tennis venues in Quebec
University sports venues in Canada
Sports venues completed in 1970
Tennis in Quebec
Soccer venues in Quebec
Sports complexes